Boyle is an Irish, Scottish and English surname of Gaelic or Norman origin. In the northwest of Ireland it is one of the most common family names. Notable people with the surname include:

Disambiguation
Adam Boyle (disambiguation), multiple people
Charles Boyle (disambiguation), multiple people
David Boyle (disambiguation), multiple people
Edward Boyle (disambiguation), several people
Henry Boyle (disambiguation), multiple people
James Boyle (disambiguation) (also Jimmy Boyle), multiple people
John Boyle (disambiguation), multiple people
Kevin Boyle (disambiguation), several people
Mark Boyle (disambiguation), multiple people
Mary Boyle (disambiguation), several people
Peter Boyle (disambiguation), multiple people
Richard Boyle (disambiguation), multiple people
Robert Boyle (disambiguation), multiple people
Stephen Boyle (disambiguation), multiple people
Tommy Boyle (disambiguation), several people

Arts and media
Alicia Boyle (1908–1997), Irish artist
Bob Boyle, American animator
Charles P. Boyle (1892–1968), American cinematographer
Chris Cornell (1964-2017), musician, born Christopher Boyle
Danny Boyle (born 1956), British film director, cousin of John Wayne
Derek Paul Jack Boyle (born 1985), American visual artist
Edward G. Boyle, (1899–1977), Canadian set decorator
Frankie Boyle (born 1972), Scottish comedian
George Frederick Boyle (1886–1948), Australian-American composer
Ina Boyle (1889–1967), Irish composer
James Boyle (broadcasting), BBC broadcaster
Jimmy Boyle (artist) (born 1944), Scottish sculptor and novelist, former gangster
Johnny Boyle, drummer for the Irish band, The Frames
Katie Boyle (1926–2018), television presenter
Lara Flynn Boyle (born 1970), U.S. actress
Louise Boyle (1910–2005), U.S. photographer
Mark Boyle (1934–2005), Scottish artist
Peter Boyle (1935–2006), U.S. actor
Ray Boyle (born 1925), American actor
Robert F. Boyle (1909–2010), director and production designer
Ruth-Ann Boyle (born 1970), singer of the British group Olive
Shary Boyle (born 1972), Canadian artist
Susan Boyle (born 1961), Scottish singer and a contestant on the 3rd series of Britain's Got Talent
Troy Boyle (born 1966), U.S. comic book artist and writer
 Zoe Boyle (born 1989), English actress

Military
Courtenay Boyle (1770–1844), British naval officer and MP
Dermot Boyle (1904-1993), Marshal of the Royal Air Force
Edward Courtney Boyle (1883–1967), English Royal Navy officer, First World War recipient of the Victoria Cross
Jeremiah Boyle (1818–1871), Union Brigadier General during the American Civil War
William H. Boyle (1836–1919), U.S. Army Colonel
Thomas Boyle (1775–1825), U.S. Navy officer

Politics, government, and law
Andrew Boyle (politician) (died 1902), American politician
Brendan Boyle (born 1977), politician
Cavendish Boyle (1849–1916), British colonial administrator
Charles Boyle, 2nd Viscount Blesington (died 1732), Irish politician
Charles A. Boyle (1907–1959), U.S. Representative from Illinois
Charles Edmund Boyle (1836–1888), U.S. Representative from Pennsylvania
David Boyle, 7th Earl of Glasgow (1833–1915), governor of New Zealand 1892–1897
David Boyle, Lord Boyle (1772–1853), Scottish judge and privy counsellor of the United Kingdom
Sir Edward Boyle, 1st Baronet (1848–1909), MP for Taunton 1906–1909, grandfather of Baron Boyle
Edward Boyle, Baron Boyle of Handsworth (1923–1981), British Conservative Party politician, MP 1950–1970
Edward C. Boyle, (died 1981), Allegheny County District Attorney for Pittsburgh from 1956 to 1964
Edward James Boyle Sr. (1913–2002), U.S. federal judge
Emmet D. Boyle (1879–1926), former Governor of Nevada
Francis Boyle (born 1950), professor of international law
George Boyle, 6th Earl of Glasgow (1825–1890), Scottish politician
Harris Boyle (–1975), Northern Irish loyalist and Ulster Volunteer Force member
Hugh Boyle Ewing (1826–1905), American diplomat, author and lawyer
James Boyle (academic) (born 1959), professor of law
James Boyle (Irish Parliamentary Party politician) (1863–1936), Irish politician, Member of Parliament for West Donegal 1900–1902
James Boyle (Fianna Fáil politician) (fl.1930s), Fianna Fáil Member of the 1934–1936 Seanad Éireann
James Boyle Uniacke (1799–1858), Canadian politician
Jane J. Boyle (born 1954), District judge for the United States District Court for the Northern District of Texas
John Boyle (congressman) (1774–1835), member of the U.S. House of Representatives
John Boyle (Northern Ireland politician) (–1950), Unionist politician from Northern Ireland
John Robert Boyle (1870–1936), Albertan politician
Joshua Boyle (politician), Member of Parliament in the Irish House of Commons
Kenneth Boyle (1937-2000), American politician and lawyer
Kevin Boyle (lawyer) (1943–2010), Northern Ireland-born human rights activist, barrister and educator
Kevin J. Boyle (born 1980), member of the Pennsylvania House of Representatives
Larry Monroe Boyle (1943–2017), Associate Justice of the Idaho Supreme Court
Louis C. Boyle (1866–1925), American lawyer and politician
Mike Boyle (born 1944), mayor of Omaha, Nebraska
Murrough Boyle, 1st Viscount Blesington (1709–1769), governor of Limerick
Patricia Boyle (1937–2014), American judge
Sarah Patton Boyle (1906-1994), Virginian civil rights activist
Terrence Boyle (born 1945), U.S. judge
W. A. Boyle (1904–1985), president of the United Mine Workers of America union, 1963–1972
William M. Boyle (1903–1961), American Democratic political activist from Kansas

Religion
Greg Boyle (born 1954), Jesuit priest in East Los Angeles
Hugh Charles Boyle (1873–1950), American Roman Catholic bishop
John Boyle (bishop) (1563–1620), Bishop
Richard Boyle (archbishop of Tuam) (–1644), Archbishop of Tuam

Sciences, math, and medicine
Brian J. Boyle, astrophysicist
David Boyle (archaeologist) (1842–1911), Canadian educator and archaeologist
Elette Boyle, American and Israeli computer scientist and cryptographer
Helen Boyle (1869-1957), Irish-British physician and psychologist
Henry Edmund Gaskin Boyle (1875–1941), anesthesiologist
Phelim Boyle (born 1941), quantitative finance academic
Robert Boyle (1627–1691), Anglo-Irish natural philosopher
Robert William Boyle (1883–1955), Canadian physicist, co-inventor of sonar
Willard Boyle (1924–2011), Canadian physicist

Sports
Brian Boyle (born 1984), professional hockey player
Buzz Boyle (1908–1978), Major League Baseball player
Connor Boyle, Scottish rugby union player
Dan Boyle (ice hockey) (born 1976), professional ice hockey player
Daryl Boyle (born 1987), Canadian professional ice hockey player
David Boyle (rugby league, born 1959), Australian rugby league footballer
Eddie Boyle (1874–1941), Major League Baseball player
Hugh Boyle (golfer) (born 1936), Irish golfer
Jack Boyle (1866–1913), Major League Baseball player
Jim Boyle (American football) (born 1962), American football player
Jimmy Boyle (baseball) (1904–1958), American baseball player
Jimmy Boyle (footballer) (born 1972), former Scottish footballer
John Boyle (footballer, born 1946), Scottish footballer
John Boyle (footballer, born 1986), Scottish footballer
Lauren Boyle (born 1987), New Zealand swimmer
Millie Boyle (born 1998), Australian rugby union player
Morrie Boyle, Australian rugby league footballer
Patrick Boyle (footballer) (born 1987), Scottish footballer
Rachael Boyle (born 1991), Scottish footballer
Raelene Boyle (born 1951), Australian athlete
Richard Boyle (canoeist) (born 1961), New Zealand sprint canoeist
Richard Boyle (rowing) (1888–1953), British rowing coxswain and medallist at the 1908 Summer Olympics
Ryan Boyle (born 1981), U.S. lacrosse player
Ryan Boyle (rugby league) (born 1987), rugby league player
Stephen Boyle (born 1953), Australian footballer
Steve Boyle (boxer) (born 1962), Scottish boxer
Steve Boyle (rugby union) (born 1953), English rugby union player
Terry Boyle (born 1958), Former footballer from Wales
Tim Boyle (American football) (born 1994), American football player
Tommy Boyle (footballer, born 1886) (1886–1940), football player who played for Barnsley, Burnley, and Wrexham
Tommy Boyle (footballer, born 1901) (1901–1972), football player who played for Sheffield United, Manchester United, and Northampton Town
Tony Boyle (born 1957), New Zealand cricketer
Wesley Boyle (born 1979), Football midfielder

Writers
Andrew Boyle (1919–1991), journalist and biographer
Charles Boyle (poet) (born 1951), UK poet
David Boyle (author) (born 1958), economics author and journalist
John Boyle O'Reilly (1844–1890), Irish poet and novelist
Kay Boyle (1902–1992), U.S. writer and political activist
Kevin Boyle (historian) (born 1960), author and professor of history at Ohio State University
Nicholas Boyle (born 1946), British literature historian
Patrick Boyle (writer) (1905–1982), Irish writer
T. Coraghessan Boyle (born 1948), U.S. novelist and short story writer
Virginia Frazer Boyle (1863–1938), U.S. poet and writer

Other
Gert Boyle (1924–2019), German-born American businesswoman
Jarrod Boyle, American winemaker
Joseph W. Boyle (1867–1923), Canadian adventurer
Lisa Boyle (born 1964), American model
Mark Boyle (snooker player) (born 1981), Scottish snooker player
Paul Boyle (born 1964), British geographer and academic administrator
Sarah Boyle (1609–1633), wife of Richard Boyle, 1st Earl of Cork
Timothy Boyle (born 1949), American businessman

Members of Boyle family headed by the Earl of Cork
Richard Boyle, 1st Earl of Cork (1566–1643), Lord Treasurer of Ireland
Richard Boyle, 1st Earl of Burlington (1612–1698), Lord High Treasurer of Ireland
Charles Boyle, 3rd Viscount Dungarvan (1639–1694), Irish politician
Charles Boyle, 2nd Earl of Burlington (died 1704), Anglo-Irish politician
Richard Boyle, 3rd Earl of Burlington (1694–1753), architect
John Boyle, 5th Earl of Cork (1707–1762), writer and friend of Jonathan Swift
Hamilton Boyle, 6th Earl of Cork (1729–1764), British and Irish politician
Edmund Boyle, 7th Earl of Cork (1742–1798), Irish peer
Edmund Boyle, 8th Earl of Cork (1767–1856), Irish soldier and peer
Richard Boyle, 9th Earl of Cork (1829–1904), British politician
Charles Boyle, 10th Earl of Cork (1861–1925), Irish soldier and peer
William Boyle, 12th Earl of Cork (1873–1967), Admiral of the Fleet
John Boyle, 14th Earl of Cork (1916–2003), Irish peer
Roger Boyle, 1st Earl of Orrery (1621–1679), Irish soldier, statesman and dramatist
Charles Boyle, 4th Earl of Orrery (1674–1731), author, soldier and statesman
Henry Boyle, 1st Baron Carleton (1669–1725), Lord Treasurer of Ireland
Francis Boyle, 1st Viscount Shannon (1623–1699), Privy Councillor and governor of County Cork
Richard Boyle, 2nd Viscount Shannon (1675–1740), field marshal
Henry Boyle, 1st Earl of Shannon (1682–1764), Irish politician
Richard Boyle, 2nd Earl of Shannon (1727–1807), 2nd Earl of Shannon, Irish politician
Henry Boyle, 3rd Earl of Shannon (1771–1842), Irish politician
Richard Boyle, 4th Earl of Shannon (1809–1868), 4th Earl of Shannon, British politician
Henry Boyle, 5th Earl of Shannon (1833–1890), British politician
William George Boyle (1830–1908), British soldier and politician
Mary Boyle, Countess of Cork and Orrery (1746–1840), 18th-century British literary hostess

Members of Clan Boyle headed by the Earl of Glasgow
David Boyle, 1st Earl of Glasgow (1666–1733), Scottish politician
John Boyle, 2nd Earl of Glasgow (1688–1740), Scottish politician
John Boyle, 3rd Earl of Glasgow (1714–1775), Scottish politician
George Boyle, 4th Earl of Glasgow (1766–1843), British peer
James Carr-Boyle, 5th Earl of Glasgow (1792–1869), British politician and naval commander
Patrick Boyle, 10th Earl of Glasgow (born 1939), British politician and chief of Clan Boyle

See also
Boyle, County Roscommon, Irish town
Clan Boyle
O'Boyle
Governor Boyle (disambiguation)
Justice Boyle (disambiguation)

Surnames of Irish origin
Scottish surnames
Surnames of Norman origin